Flyer is the current brand name of a trio of bus services that call at Leeds Bradford Airport in England. Numbered A1, A2 and A3, the routes serve a range of towns and cities in Yorkshire including Leeds, Bradford and Harrogate.

History
The route was formerly operated under the Centrebus brand as Airport Direct.

In May 2014, the routes were rebranded by Yorkshire Tiger as Flying Tiger and new Optare Versa buses were introduced. On 3 July 2017, new Alexander Dennis Enviro200 MMC buses were introduced on route 737 and 747 alongside the previous Optare Versa vehicles which continued to operate mainly on service 757. 

In 2020, Yorkshire Tiger stopped running the 757 route. It had previously been operated on a commercial basis however this was no longer viable during the COVID-19 pandemic. The West Yorkshire Combined Authority subsequently awarded a temporary contract to CT Plus who operated the route under the Runway 757 brand. In August 2020, Yorkshire Coastliner took over operation of all three routes and also acquired the Yorkshire Tiger depot in Idle. The routes were renumbered A1, A2 and A3.

From 24 July 2022, the frequency of route A1 will be increased to a bus every 20 minutes at peak times.

Routes
A1 (formerly 757): Leeds City bus station to Leeds Bradford Airport via Leeds railway station, Kirkstall, Hawksworth, Horsforth and Rawdon.
A2 (formerly 747): Bradford Interchange to Harrogate via Bolton, Greengates, Apperley Bridge railway station, Rawdon, Yeadon, Leeds Bradford Airport, Pool-in-Wharfedale and Pannal.
A3 (formerly 737): Bradford Interchange to Otley via Shipley, Baildon, Guiseley, Yeadon, Leeds Bradford Airport and Pool-in-Wharfedale.

References

Airport bus services
Bus routes in England
Transport in Yorkshire